Sport Pilsen is a Peruvian football club, located in the city of Guadalupe, La Libertad. The club was founded with the name of club Sport Pilsen Callao, the club won the Peru Cup 1983 and played in Primera Division Peruana from 1984 until 1985.

Honours

National
Copa Perú: 1
1983

See also
List of football clubs in Peru
Peruvian football league system

External links
 FPF - Campeones de la Copa Peru (Spanish)
 RSSSF - Peru - All-Time Table Descentralizado 1966-2008
 Campeonato Descentralizado 1985

Football clubs in Peru